Woodrow Augustus Myers Jr. (born February 14, 1954) is an American physician and politician from Indiana. He served as health commissioner for Indiana and New York City. He was the Democratic nominee for governor of Indiana in the 2020 election, losing to incumbent Republican Eric Holcomb.

Early life and education
Myers is from Indianapolis. His father worked as a landscaper and his mother was a school principal. Myers graduated from Shortridge High School when he was 16 years old, from Stanford University when he was 19 years old, and from Harvard Medical School when he was 23 years old. He also attended Stanford's Graduate School of Business, and earned a Master of Business Administration.

Career 
Myers served as an assistant professor of medicine at the University of California, San Francisco, and quality assurance chairman at San Francisco General Hospital.

Health commissioner
In 1985, Governor Robert D. Orr selected Myers as Indiana's state health commissioner. He weighed  when he took the job, but went on a liquid diet. As Indiana's state health commissioner, he supported Ryan White, a teenager with AIDS who had not been permitted to attend school, in his legal challenge against the school board. Myers also supported a law that called for recording the names of those infected with HIV/AIDS and quarantining "recalcitrant carriers" of the disease. In 1987, President Ronald Reagan appointed Myers to the President's Commission on the HIV Epidemic. He resigned later that year in the midst of infighting.

In 1990, Mayor David Dinkins appointed Myers as New York City's health commissioner. He resigned in 1991, in part due to opposition to some of his HIV/AIDS policies. Myers returned to Indianapolis, and worked for Wellpoint, Corizon Health, and Blue Cross Blue Shield.

Politics
Myers ran as a Democrat for  against incumbent André Carson in the 2008 elections. He came in second place in the primary election, receiving 24% of the vote, while Carson received 46%. In July 2019, Myers announced his candidacy for the 2020 Indiana gubernatorial election. After his opponents (State Senator Eddie Melton and local business owner Josh Owens) dropped out of the race, he became the only remaining Democrat running for Governor in Indiana. He then became the party's official candidate on June 2, 2020. His running mate was Linda Lawson. He ran on a platform of investing in public education, climate change reform, and gun regulations.

Personal life
Myers is married to his wife, Stacy, and has five children. His son, Zachary A. Myers, is a lawyer and the United States Attorney for the Southern District of Indiana.

References

External links
Woody Myers (D) for Governor campaign website

|-

|-

1954 births
20th-century African-American physicians
20th-century American physicians
21st-century African-American politicians
21st-century American politicians
21st-century American physicians
African-American people in Indiana politics
African-American state cabinet secretaries
Candidates in the 2008 United States elections
Candidates in the 2020 United States elections
Commissioners of Health of the City of New York
Harvard Medical School alumni
Indiana Democrats
Living people
State cabinet secretaries of Indiana
Physicians from Indiana
Politicians from Indianapolis
Shortridge High School alumni
Stanford Graduate School of Business alumni
State health commissioners of the United States
University of California, San Francisco faculty